Kelly M. Burke is a Democratic member of the Illinois House of Representatives, representing the 36th District since January 2011. The 36th District includes all or parts of the Beverly, Mount Greenwood and Auburn-Gresham neighborhoods in the City of Chicago as well as the all or parts of the surrounding suburbs of Oak Lawn, Evergreen Park, Chicago Ridge, Hometown and Palos Hills.

In addition to serving as a state representative, Burke is also the current mayor of Evergreen Park, Illinois, serving since May 2021.

As of July 3, 2022, Representative Burke is a member of the following Illinois House committees:

 Appropriations - Higher Education (HAPI)
 (Chairwoman of) Campaign Finance Subcommittee (SHEE-CFIN)
 (Chairwoman of) Election Administration & Ballot Access Subcommittee (SHEE-ELEC)
 (Chairwoman of) Ethics & Elections Committee (SHEE)
 (Chairwoman of) Government Transparency & Accountability Subcommittee (SHEE-GTAC)
 Health Care Licenses Committee (HHCL)
 (Chairwoman of) Lobbying Subcommittee (SHEE-LOBY)
 Personnel & Pensions Committee (HPPN)
 Redistricting Committee (HRED)

Electoral history

References

External links
Representative Kelly Burke (D) 36th District at the Illinois General Assembly
By session: 99th, 98th, 97th
 
Kelly Burke at Illinois House Democrats

Democratic Party members of the Illinois House of Representatives
Illinois lawyers
Living people
Women state legislators in Illinois
People from Evergreen Park, Illinois
John Marshall Law School (Chicago) alumni
University of Illinois Urbana-Champaign alumni
Year of birth missing (living people)
21st-century American politicians
21st-century American women politicians